was a Japanese architect who designed the original buildings for the Imperial Nara Museum as well as the Kyoto Imperial Museum and was significant in introducing Western, particularly French architecture into Japan.

Coming from Chōshū, Tōkuma was a protégé of Yamagata Aritomo. In 1879 he graduated from the Imperial College of Engineering. During his late twenties and early thirties he assisted Josiah Conder in designing and building a Western-style residence for Prince Arisugawa Taruhito and then on the new Imperial Palace in Tokyo. During the 1880 he was sent to Europe and America to study interior decoration, including furniture. In 1887 he was appointed as an officer in the construction office of the Imperial Household.

Buildings
 1894 Nara Imperial Museum, now the Nara National Museum
 1895 Kyoto Imperial Museum, now the Kyoto National Museum
 1905 Museum of Agriculture (神宮農業館), Ise, Mie Prefecture, (constructed  (1891–1905)
 1909 Tōgu Palace, now Akasaka Palace (constructed 1899–1909)

Notes

Gallery

Japanese architects
People from Saga Prefecture
1854 births
1917 deaths